Yohann Rivière (born 18 August 1984) is a French former footballer who played as a forward.

Post-playing career
In 2020, he was hired as a scout by Dijon.

Honours

Guingamp
Coupe de France: 2009

References

External links

1984 births
Living people
People from Pont-l'Abbé
French footballers
Association football forwards
Ligue 1 players
Ligue 2 players
Championnat National players
En Avant Guingamp players
FC Istres players
Vannes OC players
Le Havre AC players
Dijon FCO players
US Créteil-Lusitanos players
Sportspeople from Finistère
Footballers from Brittany